= Fernando Pascale =

Dutch footballer

Personal information
- Date of birth: 18 August 1976 (age 50)
- Place of birth: Dordrecht, Netherlands
- Position: Defender

Senior career*
Years	Team	Apps	(Gls)
1996–1998	SBV Excelsior		
1998–1999	Feyenoord		
1998–2001	FC Volendam		
2001–2002	FC Dordrecht		
- * Club domestic league appearances and goals

Fernando Pascale (born 18 August 1976) is a retired Dutch football defender.
